The Mutual Black Network (MBN) was founded by the Mutual Broadcasting System in 1972 as the first national full-service radio network aimed at African Americans; it was initially branded as Mutual Reports before the branding change to MBN. With 98 affiliated stations across the United States, including flagship WNJR in New York, the network broadcast an hourly five-minute newscast at 50 minutes past the hour. It also aired sports and feature programs, and for one year beginning in the spring of 1974, a 15-minute daily soap opera called Sounds Of The City. 

Some of its special programming focused on African-American history, much of which was researched, written and narrated by MBN news anchor Ben Frazier. Other MBN news anchors included Glen Ford, John Askew and Ed Castleberry; Castleberry also hosted a celebrity interview program, Soul of Entertainment.

In 1981, the Mutual Black Network was purchased by Sheridan Broadcasting, an African American-owned company which had been a minority stockholder in MBN, and renamed the Sheridan Broadcasting Network. A decade later, SBN merged with the rival National Black Network, forming the present-day American Urban Radio Networks.

Affiliates
WNJR, Newark, New Jersey, in the New York City market --flagship station
WDAS-FM and WDAS in Philadelphia, Pennsylvania
KCOH in Houston; Texas
KJET in Beaumont, Port Arthur, Texas 
KOKY in Little Rock, Arkansas
KPRS AM‐FM in Kansas City
KYAC AM‐FM in Kirkland and Seattle, Washington
KWK in St. Louis, Missouri
WABQ in Cleveland, Ohio
WERD in Jacksonville, Florida
WIGO in Atlanta, Georgia
WRBD, Broward County, Florida and its sister FM station WCKO
WVKO in Columbus, Ohio
WWIL-FM in Wilmington, North Carolina

See also
National Black Network

References

Defunct radio stations in the United States
African-American culture
Defunct radio networks in the United States
African-American mass media
Organizations established in 1972
Mutual Broadcasting System